HD 219623 is a solitary star in the northern circumpolar constellation of Cassiopeia. HD 219623 is its Henry Draper Catalogue designation. It has an apparent visual magnitude of 5.59, which lies in the brightness range that is visible to the naked eye. According to the Bortle scale, it can be observed from dark suburban skies. Parallax measurements place it at an estimated distance of around 67.2 light years.

This star has a stellar classification of F7 V, indicating that it is an F-type main-sequence star that is generating energy at its core through the thermonuclear fusion of hydrogen into helium. It is larger than the Sun, with 120% of the Sun's radius and 122% of the solar mass; as such, it shines nearly twice as brightly as the Sun. HD 219623 is around 1.2 billion years in age, with a projected rotational velocity of 5.5 km/s. Compared to the Sun, it has a slightly higher abundance of elements other than hydrogen and helium—what astronomers term the star's metallicity. The effective temperature of the stellar atmosphere is about 6,138 K, giving it the yellow-white hued glow of an ordinary F-type star.

In 2006, this star was examined using the MIPS instrument on the Spitzer Space Telescope. An infrared excess at a wavelength of 70 μm was detected with 3-σ certainty. The data suggests the presence of circumstellar disk of orbiting dust, which is likely being replenished via debris from comets or asteroids. The temperature of this dust indicates the inner edge of the disk annulus comes to within 0.4 AU of the host star, while the outer edge extends out to around 22 AU.

References

F-type main-sequence stars
Circumstellar disks
Cassiopeia (constellation)
8853
BD+52 3410
4324
219623
114924